Chilakaluripet is a city in Palnadu district of the Indian state of Andhra Pradesh. It is the Mandal headquarters of Chilakaluripet Mandal in Narasaraopet Revenue Division.

Geography 
The Town is located in zone 3 as per Earthquake zones of India. Krishna River water from the Nagarjuna Sagar Right Canal is the main source of water for the residents.

Demographics 

 Census of India, the town had a population of 101,550. The total population constitute, 50,201 males and 51,349 females. Average sex ratio is 1023 females per 1000 males, higher than the national average of 940 per 1000. 9,525 children are in the age group of 0–6 years, of which 4,916 are boys and 4,609 are girls with a sex ratio of 938 per 1000. The average literacy rate stands at 72.08% with 52,106 literates, lower than the national average of 73.00%.

Civic administration 

Chilakaluripet Municipality was constituted in 1964 as a third grade municipality, It was upgraded to second grade in 1980 and to first grade in 2001.

Politics 

Chilakaluripet is a part of Chilakaluripet (Assembly constituency) for Andhra Pradesh Legislative Assembly. Vidadala Rajani is the present MLA of the constituency from YSRCP. It comes under Narasaraopet (Lok Sabha constituency) which was won by Lavu Srikrishna Devarayala of YSRCP Party.

Economy 

Chilakaluripet is a part of Vijayawada–Chilakaluripet growth corridor. The municipality, along with Vijayawada and Guntur Municipal Corporations are a part of a 15 MW waste-to-energy plant project, planned to be set up with the collaboration of the JITF Urban Infrastructure Limited.

Transport 

The town has no rail network and mostly depends on road connectivity. The nearby railway stations are Guntur Jn Railway Station (40 km), Narasaraopet Railway station (21 km), Satuluru Railway station (25 km) and Chirala Railway station (40 km).  National Highway 16 (India), a part of Golden Quadrilateral, passes through the city. It has a total NH16 length of in the City , and total length of Roads in the City  APSRTC operates buses from Chilakaluripet bus station. The National Highway 16, which connects Metropolitan cities Kolkata and Chennai. A part of Golden Quadrilateral highway network, A intersecting Part of the Asian Highway 45, And State Highway 45 From Piduguralla To Chirala Passes the Through City

Education 

The primary and secondary school education is imparted by government, aided and private schools, under the School Education Department of the state.
A Private English Medium School which was established long back at Chilakaluripet, Guntur in Andhra Pradesh, Recognised by Government of Andhra Pradesh.
Chilakaluripeta is surrounded by many Degree, PG, Pharmacy And Engineering Colleges, Sadineni Chowdaraiah College of Arts Science PG Center (Maddirala), Modern Degree College (Modern Educational Institutions), DRNSCVS Degree College, AMG Degree College, Nikhila Degree College, Sharada College of Pharmaceutical Sciences (Kotappakonda), CR Engineering College (Ganapavaram).

See also 
 List of cities in Andhra Pradesh

References 

Cities in Andhra Pradesh
Mandal headquarters in Guntur district